St. Michael's Cemetery is a cemetery located in East Elmhurst, Queens, New York. It is owned by St. Michael's Episcopal Church in Manhattan.  It was founded in 1852.

Notable burials
 Frank Costello (1891–1973), organized crime consigliere
 Joseph N. Gallo (1912–1995), organized crime consigliere
 Emile Griffith (1938–2013), professional boxer
 Luovi Halling (1867–1928), Medal of Honor recipient
 Scott Joplin (1868–1917), composer and pianist
 George Low (1847–1912), peacetime Medal of Honor Recipient
 Charles Moore (1847–1891), Civil War Medal of Honor Recipient
 John Ruhl (1873–1940), sculptor
 Yomo Toro (1933–2012), musician

References

Further reading

External links
 
 
  – 

Cemeteries in Queens, New York
Cemeteries in New York City
East Elmhurst, Queens